Toe Fat is the debut studio album by the English rock band Toe Fat. It was released in May 1970 on Parlophone in the UK and Rare Earth, a division of Motown Records in the US.

After signing with Rare Earth and Parlophone, the band released their debut single, "Working Nights" b/w "Bad Side of the Moon".

Cover artwork 
The cover art consists of four human figures on a beach who have had toes superimposed over their faces. The original release featured a nude woman standing over a crouched man, but the North American release replaced this with a lamb. The cover was designed by cover art group Hipgnosis.

Track listing 
All tracks written by Cliff Bennett, unless otherwise noted.

Personnel 
Adapted from liner notes:
 Cliff Bennett – lead vocals, piano
 Ken Hensley – guitar, organ, piano, vocals
 John Glascock – bass, vocals - erroneously credited to John Konas
 Lee Kerslake – drums, vocals

Additional personnel and production
 Mox Gowland - flute, harmonica
 Peter Mew - engineer
 Jonathan Peel - producer

References 

1970 debut albums
Parlophone albums
Progressive rock albums by English artists